The Starry Night is an 1889 painting by Vincent van Gogh.

Starry Night may also refer to:

Paintings
 Starry Night Over the Rhône, an 1888 painting by Vincent van Gogh
 Starry Night (Millet), an 1850 painting by Jean-François Millet
 Starry Night (Munch), an 1893 painting by Edvard Munch

Music

Albums
 Starry Night (album), by Julio Iglesias, 1990
 Starry Night, an album and video by Ike Moriz, 2009
 Starry Night (BoA EP) or the title song, 2019
 Starry Night (Momoland EP) or the title song (see below), 2020

Songs
 "Starry Night" (Chris August song), 2010
 "Starry Night" (Joe Satriani song), 2002
 "Starry Night" (Mamamoo song), 2018
 "Starry Night" (Momoland song), 2020
 "Starry Night", by Hixxy from Bonkers 3: A Journey into Madness, 1997
 "Starry Night", by Suho from Self-Portrait, 2020

Television and film
 "Starry Night" (Boy Meets World), a television episode
 "Starry Night" (Modern Family), a television episode
 Starry Night (1999 film), a film by Paul Davids
 Starry Night (2005 film), a short film by Ben Miller
 Starry Night, a 2006 television commercial for Halo 3
 Starry Night Productions, a television production company owned by Reinhold Weege

Other
 Starry Night (planetarium software), a software package for astronomy research and education
 Starry Night (Portland, Oregon), now the Roseland Theater, in Portland, Oregon
 Starry Night, a module in the screensaver After Dark
 Starry Nights, a 1991 novel by Shobha De

See also 
 Starry Starry Night (disambiguation)